The list of number-one digital songs of 2020 in the United States is based upon the highest-selling downloaded songs ranked in the Digital Song Sales chart published by Billboard magazine. The data are compiled by Nielsen SoundScan based on each song's weekly digital sales, which combines sales of different versions of a song by an act for a summarized figure.

Chart history

See also
2020 in American music
List of Billboard Hot 100 number-one singles of 2020
List of number-one Billboard Streaming Songs of 2020

References

External links
Current Digital Song Sales chart

United States Digital Songs
2020
Number-one digital songs